Aalbek (sometimes also Aalbeek) is a small river of Schleswig-Holstein, Germany. It drains the lake , flows through the Hemmelsdorfer See and flows into the Baltic Sea near Timmendorfer Strand.

See also
List of rivers of Schleswig-Holstein

Rivers of Schleswig-Holstein
0Aalbek
Rivers of Germany